Roberto Echavarren (born 1944 in Montevideo) is an Uruguayan poet and translator.

Works 
 La Planicie Mojada, 1981; poems
 El espacio de la verdad: Felisberto Hernández, Buenos Aires, Sudamericana, 1981; essay
 Animalaccio, 1986; poems
 Montaje y alteridad del sujeto: Manuel Puig, Santiago de Chile, Maitén, 1986; essay
 Aura Amara, 1989; poems
 Poemas Largos, 1990
 Universal Ilógico, 1994
 Oír no es ver, 1994; poems
 Ave Roc, Montevideo, Graffiti, 1994; novel
 Arte andrógino: estilo versus moda, 1998 (expanded in Montevideo, Brecha, 2008); essay
 Performance, Buenos Aires, Eudeba, 2000
 Margen de ficción: poéticas de la narrativa hispanoamericana, México, Joaquín Mortiz, 1992
 El diablo en el pelo, Montevideo, Trilce, 2003
 Casino Atlántico, Montevideo, Artefato, 2004; poems 
 Centralasia, Buenos Aires, Tse-tse, 2005; poems
 Andrógino Onetti, 2007.
 Fuera de género: criaturas de la invención erótica, Buenos Aires, Losada, 2007
 El expreso entre el sueño y la vigilia, Montevideo, Premio Fundación Nancy Bacelo, 2009 
 Ruido de fondo, Santiago de Chile, Cuarto Propio, 2009
 Yo era una brasa, Montevideo, HUM, 2009
 La salud de los enfermos, Montevideo, HUM, 2010; narrative
 Porno y postporno, Montevideo, HUM, 2011; essay (in collaboration with Ercole Lissardi and Amir Hamed)
 Las noches rusas. Materia y memoria, La Flauta Mágica, 2011; 
 The Virgin Mountain, New Orleans, Diálogos Books, 2017; poem, translated by the author and Donald Wellman.

References 

1944 births
People from Montevideo
Uruguayan people of Basque descent
University of Paris alumni
20th-century Uruguayan poets
Uruguayan male poets
Uruguayan essayists
Uruguayan literary critics
Uruguayan translators
English–Spanish translators
German–Spanish translators
Russian–Spanish translators
Living people
Male essayists
21st-century Uruguayan poets
21st-century Uruguayan male writers
20th-century essayists
21st-century essayists
20th-century Uruguayan male writers
Academic staff of the University of Montevideo
Academics of the University of London
New York University faculty
Uruguayan expatriates in France